Tillandsia tricholepis is a plant species of flowering plant in the Bromeliaceae family. It is native to Bolivia, Paraguay, Argentina, and Brazil.

References

tricholepis
Flora of South America
Epiphytes
Plants described in 1878
Taxa named by John Gilbert Baker